Franz Friedrich Theodor Fleitmann (August 20, 1828 in Schwerte - October 25, 1904 in Iserlohn) was a German chemist and entrepreneur.

Family 
Fleitmann was the son of the businessman Theodor Friedrich Fleitmann (1796-1860). His maternal grandparents were members of the Duisberg and Overweg merchant families from Iserlohn. In Elberfeld in 1856 he married Maria Winkhaus (1838-1919), the daughter of the Elberfeld silk manufacturer Friedrich Winkhaus (1791-1854). The marriage resulted in three sons and two daughters, including Richard Fleitmann (1860–1923), later General Director of United German Nickel Works in Schwerte.

Life 
After attending the provincial trade school in Hagen, he began to study chemistry in 1845. He studied in Gießen and Berlin. From 1849 to 1851 Fleitmann was the private assistant of Justus von Liebig.  In 1850 he was awarded a doctorate in natural sciences.

For health reasons, he gave up his university career in 1851 and moved to Iserlohn. There he managed the nickel smelter Neusilberwarenfabrik Herbers, Witte & Co.. In 1861, Fleitmann acquired the nickel works and together with Heinrich Witte founded the Nickel- und Kobaltfabrik Fleitmann & Witte on the Iserlohner Heath in Iserlohn, which produced blanks for the first German nickel coin in 1871 that were manufactured in the German Empire. A year earlier, the production facility had been relocated to Schwerte. The nickel coins became known as the Fleitmännchen. 

In 1877, Theodor Fleitmann succeeded in making nickel rollable and forgeable. In 1879, he "discovered and patented the addition to the molten nickel before casting of metallic magnesium in amounts of from 0.05 to 0.125 per cent, and later amended this practice to use a magnesium-nickel alloy instead." Another invention was the plating of thin nickel sheet on steel sheet. With his inventions he created the basis for the later nickel industry.

In 1898, Theodor Fleitmann was made an honorary citizen of the city of Iserlohn. Three years later he withdrew from the company, which had grown to over 1,000 employees, and passed it on to his sons Richard (1860-1923) and Theodor Fleitmann (1861-1945). In 1901 the Technische Hochschule Charlottenburg awarded him an honorary doctorate. He was a member of the Society of German Natural Scientists and Doctors. 

Theodor Fleitmann died of a stroke at the age of 76. The grave of his family at the Main Cemetery Iserlohn is under monument protection.

Works

Literature

References 

19th-century German inventors
German materials scientists
German company founders
German industrialists
19th-century German chemists
19th-century German businesspeople
1828 births
1904 deaths